Maribor Branik or Branik Maribor may refer to:

AVK Branik Maribor, a water polo club
NK Branik Maribor, an association football club established in January 1949 and dissolved in August 1960
NK Maribor, an association football club established in December 1960, who joined MŠD Branik sports organization in 1988 
OK Nova KBM Branik, a women's volleyball club
RK Maribor Branik, a handball club established in 2003